Masako Eguchi (born 5 December 1949) is a Japanese luger. He competed in the men's singles and doubles events at the 1972 Winter Olympics.

References

1949 births
Living people
Japanese male lugers
Olympic lugers of Japan
Lugers at the 1972 Winter Olympics
Sportspeople from Hokkaido